Aivilik is a territorial electoral district (riding) for the Legislative Assembly of Nunavut, Canada.

The riding consists of the communities of Naujaat (formerly Repulse Bay) and Coral Harbour. The district was created prior to the 28 October 2013 general election. The communities were previously in Akulliq and Nanulik.

Election results

References

Electoral districts of Kivalliq Region
2013 establishments in Nunavut